Eaton's pintail (Anas eatoni) is a dabbling duck of the genus Anas.  It is also known as the southern pintail. The species is restricted to the island groups of Kerguelen and Crozet in the southern Indian Ocean. It resembles a small female northern pintail.  It was named after the English explorer and naturalist Alfred Edwin Eaton.  It is threatened by introduced species, particularly feral cats, which prey on it.

There are two subspecies: A. eatoni eatoni (Kerguelen pintail) and A. eatoni drygalskii (Crozet pintail).

References

External links

BirdLife Species Factsheet

Eaton's pintail
Birds of the Indian Ocean
Birds of subantarctic islands
Fauna of the Crozet Islands
Fauna of the Kerguelen Islands
Eaton's pintail
Eaton's pintail